T. Challapalle is a village in Uppalaguptam Mandal, Dr. B.R. Ambedkar Konaseema district in the state of Andhra Pradesh in India.

Geography 

Demographics 
 India census,T. Challapalle had a population of 9291, out of which 4620 were male and 4671 were female. The population of children below 6 years of age was 10%. The literacy rate of the village was 73%.

References 

Villages in Uppalaguptam mandal